The Road to Stardom With Missy Elliott was a competitive reality television show that aired on the UPN Network in 2005. The main judge and host was hip-hop artist Missy Elliott. Other judges were singer-producer Teena Marie, producer Dallas Austin, and manager Mona Scott.

Contestants

 Akil: 23-year-old teacher from Jersey City, New Jersey
Cori Yarckin: 21-year-old recent college graduate from Orlando, Florida
Deltrice: 23-year-old clothing designer from San Francisco
Eddie: 25-year-old construction worker from New Orleans
Frank B: 21-year-old construction worker from Brooklyn, New York
Heather Bright: 22-year-old student from Boston
Jessica Betts: 23-year-old writer from Chicago
Marcus: 24-year-old security guard from Houston
Matthew: 25-year-old theme park entertainer from Orlando, Florida
Melissa: 19-year-old student from Plymouth, Minnesota
Nic: 29-year-old disc jockey from Aliso Viejo, California
Nilyne Fields: 23-year-old make-up artist/student from Plainfield, New Jersey
Yelawolf: 24-year-old contract artist (mural painting) from Rainbow City, Alabama

Jessica Betts was named the Season 1 winner. The show was not picked up for a second season.

References

External links
Missy Elliott Project
Official Website (via Internet Archive)

2005 American television series debuts
2005 American television series endings
2000s American reality television series
UPN original programming